Joyce–Collingwood (formerly Joyce) is an elevated station on the Expo Line, a part of Metro Vancouver's SkyTrain rapid transit system. The station is located on Joyce Street at Vanness Avenue, in the Renfrew–Collingwood neighbourhood of Vancouver, British Columbia, Canada.

History
The station was designed by the Austrian architecture firm Architektengruppe U-Bahn and opened in 1985 as "Joyce station" on the original Expo Line. Trolley wires were extended to the station in early 1986 to bring trolley buses to the station's bus loop.

The station is located on the former right-of-way once used by the British Columbia Electric Railway's Central Park Line; this line ran from just west of Nanaimo station to where New Westminster station is located.

Formerly an industrial area, the immediate vicinity of this station has since been redeveloped as Collingwood Village, a denser community of high-rise condominiums. The "Collingwood" portion of the name was added in 2001 in an attempt to reflect the positive impact of SkyTrain on the surrounding community, as the station had been known to have a particularly negative community impact in terms of contributing to higher rates of crime and violence since its opening.

As part of Expo Line upgrades, renovations on the station began in early 2016. Phase one of the project was completed on October 6, 2017; it included a replacement of the existing elevator, the installation of two new escalators at the east end of the platform to replace the original single one, and the improvement of the station design and integration with the surrounding community. Phase two renovations began in early 2018 and were completed on June 15, 2019.

Services
 The station connects to a number of TransLink bus routes serving eastern Vancouver, Burnaby, and North Vancouver.
 It is one of the termini for the R4 41st Ave RapidBus service, which replaced the 43 express route that ran west from this station to the University of British Columbia on January 6, 2020.

Station information

Station layout

Entrances

 West entrance : located on the west side of Joyce Street, in the centre of the bus loop. The entrance is fully accessible with an elevator and an up escalator.
 East entrance : located on the east side of Joyce Street, on the opposite side of the bus loop. The entrance is also fully accessible, including up and down escalators, an elevator, and a staircase. This entrance serves the passenger drop-off area.

Transit connections

Joyce–Collingwood station provides a partial off-street transit exchange at the intersection of Joyce Street and Vanness Avenue. Bus bay assignments are as follows:

References

Expo Line (SkyTrain) stations
Railway stations in Canada opened in 1985
Buildings and structures in Vancouver